Soolam is a 1980 Indian Tamil-language film produced, directed and written by M. Bhaskar. The film stars Rajkumar Sethupathi and Raadhika, with Sudheer, Pushpalatha, Thengai Srinivasan and Manorama in supporting roles. It was released on 12 December 1980.

Plot

Cast 
Rajkumar Sethupathi
Raadhika as Annamma
Sudheer as Peter
Pushpalatha
Thengai Srinivasan
Manorama

Production 
Soolam is the first film produced by Bhaskar through his company Oscar Movies.

Soundtrack 
The soundtrack was composed by Ilaiyaraaja.

References

External links 
 

1980 films
1980s Tamil-language films
Films directed by M. Bhaskar
Films scored by Ilaiyaraaja